Umakanta Academy (Bengali: উমাকান্ত একাডেমি) is an educational institute located in Agartala, India. Established in 1862, it is the oldest school in Tripura. It is affiliated to TBSE.

History
The Agartala HE school was founded by Maharaja Bir Chandra Manikya in 1890 and developed by Maharaja Radha Kishore Manikya when he acceded to the throne in 1896. It was renamed as Umakanta Academy in 1904 in honour of chief Minister of the Tripura Kingdom Umakanta Das. It has two playgrounds, one swimming pool, a hostel and a football stadium with floodlights and galleries.

Notable alumni
Sudhanwa Debbarma (1918 – 1999), Kokborok writer, political leader and member of the Communist Party of India (Marxist), Speaker of Tripura Legislative Assembly, leader of Ganamukti Parishad, and a member of Tripura Legislative Assembly (1977-1988).

References

External links
 

Educational institutions established in 1890
Schools in Tripura
Education in Agartala
1890 establishments in India